Richard C. "Rickey" Williams (born March 12, 1957) is a retired American basketball player. Born in Buffalo, New York, he was a 6'1"  point guard and attended Long Beach State and the University of New Mexico.

Williams played for the NBA's Utah Jazz during the 1982–83 season, averaging 3.3 points, 0.9 rebounds and 0.8 assists per game. He was originally selected by the Jazz (then based in New Orleans as the New Orleans Jazz) with the 4th pick in the tenth round of the 1978 NBA draft.

External links
NBA stats @ basketballreference.com

1957 births
Living people
Alberta Dusters players
American expatriate basketball people in Canada
Basketball players from Buffalo, New York
Bay State Bombardiers players
Detroit Spirits players
Long Beach State Beach men's basketball players
New Mexico Lobos men's basketball players
New Orleans Jazz draft picks
Point guards
Utah Jazz players
American men's basketball players